Sidi Addi is a town in Ifrane Province, Fès-Meknès, Morocco. According to the 2004 census, it has a population of 2895.

References

Populated places in Ifrane Province